Colette Senghor née Hubert (20 November 1925 –19 November 2019) was a French-born public figure who served as the first First Lady of Senegal from 1960 to 1980, as the wife of President Léopold Sédar Senghor following independence in 1960.

Biography 

Hubert was born in Mouzay, Meuse, France and came from a family of old Norman nobility. She was introduced to the Léopold Sédar Senghor, then deputy of Senegal and they married in 1957. When in 1960, Senghor became the president of Senegal, she took no public political position, preferring to be interested in his poetic writings. When Senghor left power, the couple went to France where they stayed in Normandy. She died on November 19, 2019 in Verson, in the western region of Normandy, at their family home.

References 

1925 births
2019 deaths
People from Meuse (department)
French emigrants to Senegal
Senegalese people of French descent
First Ladies of Senegal